Záhony is a district in northern part of Szabolcs-Szatmár-Bereg County. Záhony is also the name of the town where the district seat is found. The district is located in the Northern Great Plain Statistical Region. This district is a part of Rétköz geographical region.

Geography 
Záhony District borders with the Ukrainian oblast of Zakarpattia to the northeast, Vásárosnamény District to the southeast, Kisvárda District to the south, Cigánd District (Borsod-Abaúj-Zemplén County) to the west, the Slovakian region of Košice to the northwest. The number of the inhabited places in Záhony District is 11.

Municipalities 
The district has 2 towns, 1 large village and 8 villages.
(ordered by population, as of 1 January 2013)

The bolded municipalities are cities, italics municipality is large village.

Demographics

In 2011, it had a population of 18,963 and the population density was 130/km2.

Ethnicity
Besides the Hungarian majority, the main minorities are the Roma (approx. 2,500) and Ukrainian (100).

Total population (2011 census): 18,963
Ethnic groups (2011 census): Identified themselves: 19,372 persons:
Hungarians: 16,689 (86.15%)
Gypsies: 2,420 (12.49%)
Others and indefinable: 263 (1.36%)
Approx. 500 persons in Záhony District did declare more than one ethnic group at the 2011 census.

Religion
Religious adherence in the county according to 2011 census:

Reformed – 10,635;
Catholic – 3,499 (Roman Catholic – 2,401; Greek Catholic – 1,098);
other religions – 426;
Non-religious – 725; 
Atheism – 39;
Undeclared – 3,639.

Gallery

See also
List of cities and towns of Hungary

References

External links
 Postal codes of the Záhony District

Districts in Szabolcs-Szatmár-Bereg County